Peter Schmidt (12 June 1782 – 4 March 1845) was a Norwegian merchant and politician.

Peter Schmidt was born in Trondheim, Norway. He was  merchant, whose parents had re-located to  Trondheim from the trading center and port city of Flensburg in Schleswig-Holstein. He was educated in the trade, and actively participated in the family mercantile business.  Schmidt liquidated his business in 1826 and went into public service.  He was Public Commissioner of Roads (tukthusinspektør) 1833-1842 and later inspector at the prison.

Peter Schmidt represented the city of Trondhjem at the Norwegian Constituent Assembly in 1814, together with Andreas Rogert. At Eidsvoll,  he  generally supported the union party (Unionspartiet) .

Personal life
He was the son of merchant Claus Christian Petersen Schmidt (1751- 1831) and Johanne Christine Bech (1754-1840). In 1804, he married Anna Sophie Grundt (1781- 1866). He was the father of a number of children.

References

1782 births
1845 deaths
People from Trondheim
Norwegian merchants
Fathers of the Constitution of Norway
19th-century Norwegian businesspeople